Hamran Peter (born 6 June 1997) is a Malaysian professional footballer who plays as a midfielder for Malaysia Super League club Melaka United on loan from Penang.

References

1997 births
Living people
Malaysian footballers
People from Sabah
Sabah F.C. (Malaysia) players
Association football midfielders